The Socialist Alternative Movement (MAS), formerly known as the Left Revolutionary Front is a Trotskyist organization in Portugal. It was the Portuguese section of the International Workers' League (Fourth International) until they split in 2017. It ran on a joint list with the Madeira-based Labour Party in the 2015 parliamentary elections.

The party was founded as the Left Revolutionary Front (FER) in 1983. This was dissolved in 2005 and merged with the student activist movement Ruptura (which was part of the Left Bloc) to form Ruptura/FER.

The party says in its constitution that "the fight against capitalist exploitation and all forms of oppression of human beings by a socialist democratic regime, for workers' power, to ensure the transition to socialism and communism. We understand by socialism a society in which power is exercised democratically by the workers and Communism a society without classes and without the state. This implies the rejection of the "experiences" of capitalism management spearheaded by the social democrats (PS governments) or of totalitarian regimes dominated by a single Stalinist party".

The party was renamed to MAS and registered as a party in August 2013 (a first attempt at registration in March 2013 was rejected, since its statute violated the assumptions required by the Constitutional Court).

See also
List of Trotskyist internationals

Notes

References

External links
Frente da Esquerda Revolucionária (Ruptura/FER) (Portuguese)
International Workers' League (Fourth International)

International Workers League – Fourth International
Trotskyist organisations in Portugal
Political parties established in 1983
Political parties disestablished in 2005
1983 establishments in Portugal
2005 disestablishments in Portugal
Communist parties in Portugal
Left-wing parties